Herstmonceux Place is an 18th-century country house in Herstmonceux, East Sussex, England. It was divided into apartments in the 1950s. The house stands within a  shared estate with Herstmonceux Castle. Herstmonceux Place is a Grade I listed building.

The gardens and parks of Herstmonceux Place and Castle are Grade II* listed on the Register of Historic Parks and Gardens.

References

Grade I listed buildings in East Sussex
Grade I listed houses
Grade II* listed parks and gardens in East Sussex
Country houses in East Sussex
Place